Primera Iglesia Evangélica Metodista Buenos Aires is a temple of Methodist religion located in the city of Buenos Aires. It was the first Church of Methodist religion in South America, established in Buenos Aires since 1836.

History 

The Evangelical Methodist Church was introduced in Argentina at the initiative of the government of the Argentine Confederation,. who entrusted the New York Reverend John Dempster, the mission of serving the large number of American, British and German immigrants who professed the Protestant religion. 

It was originally located on Cangallo street (current Juan Domingo Perón), between 25 de Mayo and Reconquista, neighborhood of San Nicolás, Buenos Aires. The new temple was made by the architect Enrique Hunt, and inaugurated in 1874, on Corrientes Street at 718 Buenos Aires City.

Gallery

References 

National Historic Monuments of Argentina
Religious organizations established in 1836
Churches completed in 1875
Christianity in Buenos Aires
Buildings and structures in Buenos Aires
1836 establishments in Argentina